Pak Yong-jin (born 29 October 1989) is a North Korean former footballer. He represented North Korea on at least five occasions in 2010.

Career statistics

International

References

1989 births
Living people
North Korean footballers
North Korea international footballers
Association football defenders
Rimyongsu Sports Club players